Virat Kohli (born 5 November 1988) is an Indian international cricketer and the former captain of the India national team who plays as a right-handed batsman for Royal Challengers Bangalore in the IPL and for the Delhi in Indian domestic cricket. Widely regarded as one of the greatest batsmen of all time, he holds the records for scoring most runs in T20 internationals and in the IPL. In 2020, the International Cricket Council named him the male cricketer of the decade. Kohli has also contributed to a number of India's successes, including winning the 2011 World Cup and the 2013 Champions trophy.

Born and raised in New Delhi, Kohli trained at the West Delhi Cricket Academy and started his youth career with the Delhi Under-15 team. He made his international debut in 2008 and quickly became a key player in the ODI team and later made his Test debut in 2011. In 2013, Kohli reached the number one spot in the ICC rankings for ODI batsmen for the first time. During 2014 T20 World Cup, he set a record for the most runs scored in the tournament. In 2018, he achieved yet another milestone, becoming the world's top-ranked Test batsman, making him the only Indian cricketer to hold the number one spot in all three formats of the game. His form continued in 2019, where he became the first player to score 20,000 international runs in single decade. In 2021, Kohli made the decision to step down as the captain of the Indian national team for T20Is, following the T20 World Cup and in early 2022 he stepped down as the captain of the Test team as well.

Kohli has received many accolades for his performances on the cricket field. He was recognized as the ICC ODI Player of the Year in 2012 and has won Sir Garfield Sobers Trophy, given to the ICC Cricketer of the Year, on two occasions, in 2017 and 2018. Kohli also won ICC Test Player of the Year and ICC ODI Player of the Year awards in 2018, becoming the first player to win both awards in the same year. Additionally, he was named the Wisden Leading Cricketer in the World for three consecutive years, from 2016 to 2018. At the national level, Kohli was honoured with the Arjuna Award in 2013, the Padma Shri under the sports category in 2017 and the Rajiv Gandhi Khel Ratna award, India's highest sporting honour, in 2018.

In 2016, he was ranked as one of the world's most famous athletes by ESPN and one of the most valuable athlete brands by Forbes. In 2018, Time magazine included him on its list of the 100 most influential people in the world. In 2020, he was ranked 66th in Forbes list of the top 100 highest-paid athletes in the world for the year 2020 with estimated earnings of over $26 million.

Early life 
Virat Kohli was born on 5 November 1988 in Delhi to a Punjabi Hindu family. His father, Prem Kohli, worked as a criminal lawyer and his mother, Saroj Kohli, served as a housewife. He has an older brother, Vikas, and an older sister, Bhawna.  Kohli's formative years were spent in the Uttam Nagar and commenced his early education at Vishal Bharti Public School. According to his family, Kohli exhibited an early affinity for cricket as a mere three-year-old. He would pick up a cricket bat, display natural skill, and request his father to bowl to him.

In 1998, the West Delhi Cricket Academy (WCDA) was created and on 30 May of that year, Prem Kohli, espoused his younger son's fervor for cricket, assisted nine-year-old Kohli's aspirations and arranged for him to meet Rajkumar Sharma, who initially perceived him to be just another enthusiastic and determined young boy. However, two weeks later, Sharma was impressed by Kohli's accuracy and power in throwing. Upon the suggestion of their neighbours, Kohli's father considered enrolling his son in a professional cricket academy, as they believed that his cricketing abilities merited more than just playing in the gully cricket. Despite his abilities, he faced the setback of being unable to secure a place in the under-14 Delhi team, not due to a lack of merit but due to extraneous factors. Prem Kohli received offers to relocate his son to influential clubs, which would have ensured his selection, but he declined the proposals, as he was determined that Kohli should earn his recognition based on his own merit and overcome the system of nepotism and deceit prevalent in the Delhi and District Cricket Association (DDCA). Kohli persisted and eventually found his way into the under-15 Delhi team. He received training at the academy while simultaneously participating in matches at the Sumeet Dogra Academy located at Vasundhara Enclave. As per Sharma's recollection of Kohli's initial days at his academy, he exuded remarkable talent, making it arduous for the coach to curb his enthusiasm. Kohli remained prepared to bat at any position, and often, Sharma had to physically coerce him to leave the training sessions, as he was reluctant to depart. In pursuit of furthering his cricketing career, he transitioned to Saviour Convent School during his ninth-grade education. Kohli's ardent passion for cricket compelled him to travel long distances with his father to ensure that he never missed a match. With time, he diligently honed his skills and diversified his range of shots, commanding respect from the local bowlers. 

On the 19th of December 2006, Kohli experienced the loss of his father due to a cerebral attack. During his childhood, his father played a crucial role in supporting his cricket training. Kohli has credited his father as the one who drove him to practice every day. He has expressed his feelings of missing his father's presence at times. Following the demise of Kohli's father, his mother observed a significant change in his personality. Kohli appeared to become more mature overnight, and he began taking every cricket match seriously. He harbored an aversion to exclusion from games and appeared to channel his entire existence into the pursuit of cricket following his father's untimely demise. Kohli's family resided in Meera Bagh, Paschim Vihar until the year 2015, after which they relocated to Gurgaon.

Youth and domestic career

Delhi 
Kohli's junior cricket career kicked off in October 2002 at the Luhnu cricket ground in a Polly Umrigar match against the host state of Himachal Pradesh. In his debut match, Kohli managed to score a total of fifteen runs. His first half-century in national cricket came at Ferozeshah Kotla, where he scored 70 runs against Harayana. By the end of the season, Kohli had amassed a total of 172 runs, emerging as the highest run-scorer for his side with an average of 34.40. During the 2003-04 season, Kohli was appointed as the captain of the under-15 team. In his first match of the season, he scored 54 runs in Delhi's victory over Himachal Pradesh. In the next fixture against Jammu and Kashmir, Kohli scored his maiden century with a score of 119 in a BCCI-conducted game. By the end of the season, he had amassed a total of 390 runs at an average of 78, which included two centuries. Towards the end of 2004, Kohli earned selection for the 2004-05 Vijay Merchant Trophy with the Delhi under-17 team. In the four matches that he played, Kohli accumulated a total of 470 runs, with his highest score being 251* runs. The team's coach, Ajit Chaudhary, lauded his performance and was particularly impressed with his temperament on the field. In the 2005-06 season, Kohli commenced his innings with a score of 227 against Punjab. Following their victory over Uttar Pradesh in the quarter-finals, Delhi was scheduled to play against Baroda in the semi-finals. The team had high expectations from Kohli, who had promised his coach to finish the job. True to his word, Kohli went on to score 228 runs, leading Delhi to victory. The team later secured the tournament with a five-wicket win over Mumbai, where he contributed with a half-century in the first innings. He ended as the highest run-scorer with a total of 757 runs from 7 matches, averaging 84.11. 

On the 18th of February, 2006, Kohli made his debut in List A cricket, playing against Services in the Ranji One-Day Tophy, but he did not have the opportunity to bat during the match. In 2006, Kohli had garnered enough attention to earn a spot in the state senior team. Subsequently, he made his first-class debut on the 23rd of November, 2006, during the opening match of the Ranji Trophy season against Tamil Nadu. However, his debut innings was a brief one, as he was dismissed after scoring ten runs. In a sequence of three matches, Kohli failed to score a fifty, leading his coaches to provide him with counselling. In the subsequent match against former champions, Karnataka, Delhi found themselves trailing with a score of 130/5, with Kohli remaining unbeaten on 40 at the end of the day's play. Unfortunately, that very night, Kohli's father passed away at 3:54 a.m. Despite the heart-wrenching news, Kohli returned to the match and continued to bat and scored 90 runs before he was dismissed. The team's coach, Chetan Chauhan was impressed by Kohli's resolute determination and unwavering attitude in the face of adversity. Venkatesh Prasad also lauded his crucial knock, which was executed in the midst of an emotional upheaval. Following his dismissal, Kohli immediately attended his father's funeral. His innings, however, proved to be crucial for Delhi as they were able to avoid the follow-on. The team's captain, Mithun Manhas, praised Kohli for his performance, acknowledging its pivotal role in the team's success. 

Kohli's foray into T20 cricket took place in April 2007, during the Inter-State T20 Championship, where he emerged as the top run-getter for his team with a tally of 179 runs at an average of 35.80. In September 2008, Kohli played in Nissar Trophy against SNGPL (reigning champions of the of Quaid-i-Azam Trophy from Pakistan). He emerged as the leading scorer for Delhi in both innings, registering 52 runs in the first innings and a towering 197 in the second. The match ultimately ended in a draw, SNGPL being declared the victors due to their lead in first innings. In the 2009-10 Ranji Trophy season, Kohli returned to domestic cricket. During a match against Maharastra, he opened the batting and scored 67 runs, helping Delhi to secure the bonus point required for victory. Kohli's performance reinvigorated the competitive spirit of the domestic cricket circuit. Ashish Nehra observed his growth over time and shared his thoughts:

India Under-19 
In July 2006, Kohli was selected in the India Under-19 squad on its tour of England. He averaged 105 in the three-match ODI series against England Under-19s, while also averaging 49 in the three-match Test series. Following India Under-19's success in both the ODI and Test series, the team's coach Lalchand Rajput noted Kohli's adeptness in facing both pace and spin bowling and expressed his admiration for profound technical prowess. In September, the India Under-19 team toured Pakistan. In the first Test match, Kohli scored 63 and 28 as India won by 271 runs against Pakistan Under-19s. In the second match, he contributed 83 runs to India's victory by 240 runs and an innings. He concluded the tour with 80 runs in the final ODI game at Lahore.  In early 2007, Kohli was a part of the India Under-19 team that toured New Zealand, where he scored 113 in the first Test match. The series ended in a draw with a 1-1 scoreline. In the following month, the team travelled to Malaysia for a tri-series against England Under-19s and Sri Lanka Under-19s, where Kohli didn't get many opportunities to bat. In JulyAugust, India Under-19 embarked on a tour for a tri-series against Sri Lanka Under-19s and Bangladesh Under-19s, where he didn't score a half-century in any of the matches. However, he made a comeback with scores of 144 and an unbeaten 94 in the following Test series.

In February–March 2008, Kohli assumed the captaincy of the Indian squad that went on to triumph at the 2008 Under-19 Cricket World Cup held in Malaysia. He demonstrated his competence as a batsman, amassing 235 runs in 6 games at an average of 47, ranking as the tournament's third-highest scorer and one of three cricketers to compile a century. His century, a knock of 100 runs off 74 balls, versus the West Indies Under-19s in a group stage encounter, was lauded by ESPNcricinfo, as "the innings of the tournament." This innings paved the way for India's 50-run triumph and fetched Kohli the man of the match award. Additionally, Kohli's all-round performance in the semi-final against New Zealand Under-19s, where he captured 2 wickets and contributed 43 runs in the run-chase, was significant to India's 3-wicket victory. In the championship match, Kohli managed a modest score of 19 against South Africa Under-19s, his contribution lead to India's eventual 12-run win (via D/L method).

In June of the year 2008, Kohli and his Under-19 teammates Pradeep Sangwan and Tanmay Srivastava were awarded the Border-Gavaskar scholarship. This scholarship, aimed at honing the skills of the chosen cricketers, provided an opportunity to train for six weeks at Cricket Australia's Centre of Excellence in Brisbane. In a bid to identify potential talent for the senior team, Kohli was selected to represent India Emerging Players in the Emerging Players Tournament of 2008. Notably, his finest performance in the tournament was against New Zealand Emerging Players, where he played a knock of 120 runs, leading India to a seven-wicket victory. With an aggregate of 204 runs, Kohli's performances did not go unnoticed by the national selectors who were observing his progress. With twenty-eight under-19 ODIs and twelve under-19 Tests, he embarked on his journey to international cricket by joining the senior team on their flight to Colombo.

International career

2008–2009: Debut and maiden stint 
In August 2008, Kohli was selected for inclusion in the ODl squad for the tour of Sri Lanka and the Champions Trophy in Pakistan. Prior to the Sri Lankan tour, Kohli had limited experience, with only eight List A matches under his belt. So, his selection was considered a "surprise call-up". During the Sri Lankan tour, as both first-choice openers Sachin Tendulkar and Virender Sehwag, were unable to play due to injury, Kohli was required to fill the role of makeshift opener throughout the series. On 18 August 2008, Kohli made his international debut at the age of 19 in the first ODI of the tour, where he was dismissed for 12 runs, caught dead in front by an incutter from Nuwan Kulasekara. However, in the fourth match of the series, Kohli achieved his inaugural half century in the ODl format, with a total of fifty-four runs scored.

Following the postponement of the Champions Trophy to 2009, Kohli was picked as a replacement for the injured Shikhar Dhawan in the India A squad for the unofficial Tests against Australia A in September 2008. Despite limited opportunities, he managed to make an impact in the single innings that he participated in, scoring 49 runs. In October 2008, Kohli participated in a four-day tour match against Australia as part of the Indian Board President's XI team. The match featured a formidable Australian bowling line-up that consisted of Brett Lee, Stuart Clark, Mitchell Johnson, Peter Siddle and Jason Krejza. Despite this, Kohli displayed his batting prowess by scoring 105 runs in the first innings and an unbeaten 16 runs in the second innings, demonstrating his ability to perform against high-level international competition.

In November 2008, Kohli was selected for inclusion in the squad for the home ODI series against England, due to the presence of established and experienced players such as Tendulkar and Sehwag, he was not given an opportunity to play in any of the matches. In December 2008, Kohli was awarded a Grade D contract by the Board of Control for Cricket in India (BCCI) as part of the annual contract list for the Indian national team which entitled him to receive , A certain level of remuneration for representing the national team in various matches and events. Despite being awarded a contract, in January, Kohli was dropped for the five-match ODl series against Sri Lanka in Sri Lanka.

In July–August 2009, Kohli was selected in the four-team Emerging Players Tournament, held in Australia. He was selected to open the innings for the Indian Emerging Players team in the tournament, and he went on to have a standout performance. Kohli finished as the tournament's leading run-scorer, with a total of 398 runs from seven matches, at an average of 66.33. He was particularly impressive in the final match, where he scored 104 runs off 102 balls against the South Africa Emerging Players team in Brisbane. His strong performance helped lead his team to a 17-run victory and the tournament title. At the conclusion of the tournament, Kris Srikkanth, the Chairman of the Indian national selection committee, expressed his admiration for Kohli's performance during the tournament. Srikkanth stated,"I must say, opener Virat Kohli was outstanding. Some of the shots he played spoke about his ability." Kohli himself has stated that this tournament was a "turning point" in his career.

In August 2009, Kohli returned to the national team after recovering from a minor shoulder injury, replacing the injured Gautam Gambhir in the Indian squad for the tri-series in Sri Lanka. He was also utilized as a middle order batsman in the 2009 ICC Champions Trophy due to an injury sustained by Yuvraj Singh. In December of that same year, he was included in the team for home ODI series against Sri Lanka  and scored 27 and 54 in the first two ODIs before making way for Yuvraj, who regained fitness for the third ODI. However, due to the reoccurrence of a finger injury, Yuvraj was ruled out indefinitely, which led to Kohli's return to the team in the fourth ODI at Kolkata. In that match, Kohli scored his maiden ODI century–107 off 114 balls–while sharing a 224-run partnership for the third wicket with Gambhir. As a result of this performance, India won by seven wickets and sealed the series 3–1.

2010–2011: Rise through the ranks 
In January 2010, Kohli was given the opportunity in tri-nation ODI tournament in Bangladesh, as Tendulkar was rested for the event. During the series, Kohli became just the third Indian player to score two ODI centuries before the age of 22. He was widely hailed for his performances, and ultimately emerged as the leading run-scorer of the series, with 275 runs from five innings at an impressive average of 91.66. Kohli's success on the field belies the stereotype of him as a brash and arrogant player. In fact, Indian captain MS Dhoni has noted that "he has grabbed his chances" and that "he has matured now." Dhoni went on to say that "To us, he comes as a 'humble guy'. He might come across different to the world." Kohli's initial foray into leadership on an international level occurred in May–June 2010, when he was appointed as vice-captain for the tri-series against Sri Lanka and Zimbabwe in Zimbabwe. This appointment came as many more established players were rested for the tour. However, in the first match, Kohli was dismissed on a diamond duck, a rare and unusual mode of dismissal. Despite this early setback, Kohli managed to become the fastest Indian batsman at the time to reach 1,000 runs in ODI cricket, achieving this milestone in 26 innings. Kohli also made his International T20 debut against Zimbabwe at Harare, where he scored an unbeaten 26. Later that month, during the 2010 Asia Cup, Kohli was included in the Indian team and was given the role of batting at number 3. However, his struggles with form started as he scored a total of 67 runs at an average of 16.75. This poor form was also reflected in the tri-series against Sri Lanka and New Zealand in Sri Lanka where his average was a mere 15.

Despite his recent struggles with form, Kohli was retained in the Indian ODI squad for a three-match series against Australia in October. In the only completed match of the series, held at Visakhapatnam, Kohli scored a century, earning him the man of the match award. He candidly acknowledged that he was under significant pressure to maintain his place in the team, given his previous failures in the preceding series. During the home ODI series against New Zealand, Kohli scored another match-winning century in the first match, marking his fourth ODI hundred and second in succession. The Indian team emerged victorious with a 5–0 whitewash over New Zealand, and Kohli's exceptional performances in the series solidified his position in the ODI team and made him a strong candidate for a spot in India's World Cup squad. He was India's leading run-scorer in ODIs in 2010, accumulating 995 runs from 25 matches at an average of 47.38, including three centuries and seven half-centuries.

Kohli was India's leading run scorer in the five-match ODI series of the South African tour in January 2011, with 193 runs including two fifties, both in Indian defeats. During the series, he jumped to number two spot on the ICC Rankings for Men's ODI batters, and was named in India's 15-man squad for the World Cup.

Kohli played in every match of India's successful World Cup campaign. He scored an unbeaten 100 in the first match against Bangladesh and became the first Indian batsman to score a century on World Cup debut. In the final against Sri Lanka at Mumbai, he scored 35, sharing an 83 runs partnership with Gambhir for the third wicket after India had lost both openers within seven overs while chasing 275.

Breakthrough in Test cricket 
When India toured the West Indies in June–July 2011, they selected a largely inexperienced squad, resting Tendulkar while others such as Gambhir and Sehwag missed out due to injuries. Kohli was one of three uncapped players in the Test squad.  Kohli made his Test debut at Kingston in the first match of the Test series that followed. He batted at 5th position and was dismissed on scores of 4 and 15, caught behind off the bowling of Fidel Edwards in both innings. India went on to win the Test series 1–0 but Kohli amassed just 76 runs from five innings, struggling against the short ball.

Initially got dropped from the Test squad for India's four-match series in England in July and August due to poor performance in his debut series. However Kohli was recalled as a replacement for the injured Yuvraj, though he did not get to play in any match of that series. He found moderate success in the subsequent ODI series in which he averaged 38.80. His score of 55 in the first ODI at Chester-le-Street was followed by a string of low scores in the next three matches. In the last game of the series at Cardiff, Kohli scored his sixth ODI hundred–107 runs off 93 balls–and shared 170 runs partnership with Rahul Dravid for the third wicket, who was playing his last ODI match. Kohli was dismissed hit wicket in that innings .It was the only century in the series by any player of either team and earned him praise for his "hard work" and "maturity".

In October 2011, Kohli was the leading run scorer of the five-match home ODI series against England which India won 5–0. He scored a total of 270 runs across five matches at an average of 90. This included unbeaten knock of 112 from 98 balls at Delhi, where he put on an unbroken 209 run partnership with Gambhir; followed by innings of 86 at Mumbai, both the knocks came in successful run chases. Owing to his ODI success, Kohli was included in the Test squad to face the West Indies in November. He was selected in the final match of the series at Mumbai in which he scored a pair of fifties. India won the subsequent ODI series 4–1 in which Kohli managed to accumulate 243 runs at 60.75. During the series, Kohli scored his eighth ODI century and his second at Visakhapatnam, where he made 117 off 123 balls in India's run chase of 270. A knock which raised his reputation as "an expert of the chase". Kohli ended up as the leading run-getter in ODIs for the year 2011, with 1381 runs from 34 matches at 47.62 including four centuries and eight fifties.

During tour of Australia in December 2011, Kohli failed to go past 25 in the first two Tests, as his defensive technique was exposed. While fielding on the boundary during the second day of the second match at Sydney, he gestured to the crowd with his middle finger for which he was fined 50% of his match fee by the match referee. He top scored in each of India's innings in the third Test at Perth with scores of 44 and 75, even as India got their second consecutive innings defeat. In the fourth and final match at Adelaide, Kohli scored his maiden Test century, 116 runs in the first innings. India suffered a 0–4 whitewash and Kohli, India's top run-scorer in the series was described as "the lone bright spot in an otherwise nightmare visit for the tourists".

2012–2013: ODI ascendancy and ascension to vice-captaincy 
In the first seven matches of the Commonwealth Bank triangular series that India played against hosts Australia and Sri Lanka, Kohli made two fifties–77 at Perth and 66 at Brisbane, both against Sri Lanka. Being set a target of 321 by Sri Lanka, Kohli came to the crease with India's score at 86/2 and went on to score 133 not out from 86 balls to take India to a comfortable win with 13 overs to spare. India earned a bonus point with the win and Kohli was named Man of the Match for his knock. Former Australian cricketer and commentator Dean Jones rated Kohli's innings as "one of the greatest ODI knocks of all time". However, Sri Lanka beat Australia three days later in their last group fixture and knocked India out of the series. With 373 runs at 53.28, Kohli finished as India's highest run-scorer and lone centurion of the series.

Kohli was appointed the vice-captain for the 2012 Asia Cup in Bangladesh on the back of his fine performances in Australia. Kohli was in fine form during the tournament, finishing as the leading run-scorer with 357 runs at an average of 119. In the final group stage match against Pakistan, he scored his personal best of 183 from 148 balls, his 11th ODI century. He helped India to chase down 330, their highest successful ODI run chase at the time. His knock was the highest individual score in Asia Cup history surpassing previous record of 144 by Younis Khan in 2004 and the joint second highest score along with Dhoni  in an ODI run-chase; also became the highest individual score against Pakistan in ODIs. Kohli was awarded the man of the match in both the matches that India won, nonetheless India could not progress to the final of the tournament.

In July–August 2012, Kohli struck two centuries in the five-match ODI tour of Sri Lanka ,106 off 113 balls at Hambantota and 128* off 119 balls at Colombo, winning man of the match in both games. India won the series 4–1 and Kohli was named player of the series. In the one-off T20I that followed, he scored a 48 ball 68, his first T20I fifty, and yet again won the player of the series award.  He continued to be in good form during the 2012 ICC World Twenty20 in Sri Lanka, with 185 runs he was highest run-getter among Indian batsmen; hitting two fifties during the tournament, against Afghanistan and Pakistan, winning man of the match for both his innings. For his performances he was named in the ICC 'Team of the Tournament'.

Kohli's Test form dipped during the first three matches of England's tour of India, between October 2012 and January 2013, with a top score of 20 and England leading the series 2–1. Overcoming his poor run of form, he scored a patient 103 from 295 balls in the last match. However, the match ended in a draw and England won their first Test series in India in 28 years. Against Pakistan in December 2012, Kohli averaged 18 in the T20Is and 4.33 in the ODIs. Troubled by the fast bowlers, particularly Junaid Khan who dismissed him on all three occasions in the ODI series. Kohli had a quiet ODI series against England, apart from a match-winning 77* in the third ODI with a total of 155 runs at an average of 38.75. Kohli scored his fourth Test century (107) at Chennai in the first match of the home Test series against Australia in February 2013. India completed a 4–0 series sweep, becoming the first team to whitewash Australia in more than four decades. Kohli averaged 56.80 in the series .

In June 2013, Kohli featured in the ICC Champions Trophy in England which India won. He scored a 144 against Sri Lanka in warm-up match. He scored moderately in India's group matches against South Africa, West Indies and Pakistan respectively. In sync India qualified for the semi-finals with an undefeated record. In the semi-final against Sri Lanka at Cardiff, he struck 58* in an eight-wicket win for India. The final between India and England at Birmingham was reduced to 20 overs after a rain delay. India batted first and Kohli top-scored with 43 from 34 ball, helping India reach 129/7 in 20 overs. India went on to secure a five run win and their second consecutive ICC ODI tournament victory. Kohli was also named as part of the 'Team of the Tournament' by the ICC.

Setting records and post-Tendulkar era 
Kohli stood in as the captain for the first ODI of the triangular series in the West Indies after Dhoni injured himself during the match; Kohli being named the captain for the remaining matches. In his second match as captain, Kohli scored his first century as captain, making 102 off 83 balls against the West Indies at Port of Spain in a bonus point win for India. Many senior players including Dhoni were rested for the five-match ODI tour of Zimbabwe in July 2013. Kohli was therefore appointed as captain for an entire series . In the first game of the series at Harare, he struck 115 runs from 108 balls, helping India chase down the target of 229 and winning the man of the match award. India completed a 5–0 sweep of the series; their first in an away ODI series.

Kohli had a successful time with the bat in the seven-match ODI series against Australia. After top-scoring with 61 in the opening loss at Pune, he struck the fastest century by an Indian in ODIs in the second match at Jaipur. Reaching the milestone in just 52 balls and putting up an unbroken 186 run partnership for second wicket with Rohit Sharma , that came in 17.2 overs. Kohli's innings of 100* helped India chase down the target of 360 with more than six overs to spare. This chase was the second-highest successful run-chase in ODI cricket at the time while Kohli's knock became the fastest century against Australia and third fastest in a run chase.  In the sixth ODI at Nagpur, he struck 115 off only 66 balls to help India successfully chase the target of 351 and level the series 2–2 . He reached the triple-digit figure in 61 balls, making it the third fastest ODI century by an Indian batsman subsequently became the fastest batsman in the world to score 17 hundreds in ODI cricket. India clinched the series after winning the last match in which he was run out for a duck. At the conclusion of the series, Kohli moved to the top position in the ICC ODI batsmen rankings for the first time in his career.

Kohli batted twice in the two-match Test series against the West Indies, and had scores of 3 and 57 . This was also the last Test series for Tendulkar and Kohli was expected to take Tendulkar's number 4 batting position after the series. In the first game of the three-match ODI series that followed at Kochi, Kohli made 86 to seal a six wicket win and won the man of the match. He missed out on his third century at Visakhapatnam in the next match, after being dismissed for 99 while playing a hook shot off Ravi Rampaul. India lost the match by two wickets, but took the series 2–1 after winning the series-decider at Kanpur. With 204 runs at 68.00, Kohli finished the series as the leading run-getter and was awarded the man of the series. India toured South Africa in December 2013 for three ODIs and two Tests. Kohli averaged 15.50 in the ODIs including a duck. In the first Test at Johannesburg, playing his first Test in South Africa and batting at 4 for the first time, Kohli scored 119 and 96. His hundred was the first by a subcontinent batsman at the venue since 1998. The match ended in a draw and Kohli was awarded man of the match. India failed to win a single match on the tour, losing the second Test by 10 wickets in which he made 46 and 11.

2014: T20 World Cup and assuming Test-captaincy 
During New Zealand tour, he averaged 58.21 in the five-match ODI series in which his all efforts went in vain as India were defeated 4–0. He made 214 runs at 71.33 in the two-match Test series that followed including an unbeaten 105 on the last day of the second Test at Wellington that helped India save the match. India then traveled to Bangladesh for the Asia Cup and World Twenty20. Dhoni was ruled out of the Asia Cup after suffering a side strain during the New Zealand tour, which led to Kohli being named the captain for the tournament. Kohli scored 136 off 122 balls in India's opening match against Bangladesh, sharing a 213 run third wicket stand with Ajinkya Rahane, which helped India successfully chase 280. It was his 19th ODI century and his fifth in Bangladesh, making him the batsman with most ODI centuries in Bangladesh. India were knocked out of the tournament after narrow losses against Sri Lanka and Pakistan in which Kohli scored 48 and 5 respectively. Dhoni returned from injury to captain the team for 2014 ICC World Twenty20 while Kohli was named vice-captain. He scored 54 off 41 balls in the game against West Indies and an unbeaten 57 from 50 balls against Bangladesh, both in successful run chases. In the semi-final, he made an unbeaten 72 in 44 deliveries to help India achieve the target of 173. He won the man of the match for this knock. In the final against Sri Lanka India posted the target of 130/4 in which Kohli top scored 77 from 58 balls. Notwithstanding his innings, India lost the match by six wickets. Kohli made a total of 319 runs in the tournament at an average of 106.33, a record for most runs by an individual batsman in a single World Twenty20 tournament. For his achievement he won the Man of the Tournament award.

India conceded a 3–1 defeat in the five-match Test series against England. Kohli experienced a dip in form during a Test series in England. Despite the broader trend of batting collapses within the national team, Kohli's lack of production has been a particularly notable storyline. The disappointment of this series, which has produced a tally of 134 runs in 10 innings with a top score of 39. Kohli's tour of England was a challenging one, marked by a series of underwhelming performances. He found himself dismissed for single-digit scores on six occasions, and appeared to struggle particularly with the swinging deliveries aimed at his off stump. This resulted in several dismissals by means of edges caught by the wicket-keeper or slip fielders. James Anderson, who was named Man of the Series, was particularly successful in dismissing Kohli, accounting for four of his wickets. Kohli's technique and ability as a batsman have been subject to analysis and critique from cricket experts and former players after the series. Despite India's victory in the following 3-1 ODI series, Kohli's batting performance did not see significant improvement, with an average of 18 runs in four innings. However, in the single T20I match, he exhibited a resurgence with a 41-ball 66, marking his first score of over 50 during the tour. Despite India's defeat in the match by a margin of three runs, Kohli's performance earned him the top position in the ICC T20I batsmen rankings.

Kohli had a successful time during India's home ODI series win over the West Indies in October 2014. His 62 in the second ODI at Delhi was his first fifty across Tests and ODIs in 16 innings since February and he stated that he got his "confidence back" with the innings.  Dhoni was rested for the five-match ODI series against Sri Lanka in November enabling Kohli to lead the team for another full series. Kohli batted at 4 throughout the series and showed moderate batting display in the first four ODIs with India leading the series 4–0. In the fifth ODI at Ranchi, he made an unbeaten 139 off 126 balls to give his team a three-wicket win and a whitewash of Sri Lanka. Kohli was awarded player of the series and it was the second whitewash under his captaincy. During the series he became the fastest batsman in the world to go past the 6000-run mark in ODIs, at the time. With 1054 ODI runs at 58.55 in 2014, he became the second player in the world after Sourav Ganguly to make more than 1,000 runs in ODIs for four consecutive calendar years.
For the first Test of the Australian tour in December 2014, Dhoni was not part of the Indian team at Adelaide due to an injury and Kohli took the reins as Test captain for the first time. Kohli scored 115 in India's first innings, becoming the fourth Indian to score a hundred on Test captaincy debut. In their second innings, India were set a target of 364 to be scored on the fifth day. Kohli put on 185 runs for the third wicket with Murali Vijay before Vijay's dismissal, which triggered a batting collapse. From 242/2, India was bowled out for 315 with Kohli's 141 off 175 balls being the top-score.

Dhoni returned to the team as captain for the second match at Brisbane where Kohli scored 19 and 1 in a four-wicket defeat for India. In the Melbourne Boxing Day Test, he made his personal best Test score(of that time) of 169 in the first innings while sharing a 262 runs partnership with Rahane, India's biggest partnership outside Asia in ten years. Kohli followed it with a score of 54 in India's second innings on the fifth day helping his team draw the Test match. Dhoni announced his retirement from Test cricket at the conclusion of this match and Kohli was appointed as the full-time Test captain ahead of the fourth Test at Sydney. Captaining the Test team for the second time, Kohli hits 147 runs in the first innings of the match and became the first batsman in Test cricket history to score three hundreds in his first three innings as Test captain. He was dismissed for 46 in the second innings and the match ended in a draw. Kohli's total of 692 runs in four Tests is the most by any Indian batsman in a Test series in Australia.

2015–2016: World Cups and limited-over success 
Kohli's form in the lead-up to the World Cup was not at its peak, as evidenced by his scores of 18 and 5 in the warm-up matches against Australia and Afghanistan. Despite his less-than-stellar form in the warm-up matches, Kohli was able to rise to the occasion and deliver a commanding performance in the first match of the World Cup against Pakistan at Adelaide by scoring 107 runs from 126 deliveries. This feat earned him the man of the match award and established him as the first Indian batsman to score a century against Pakistan in a World Cup match. In India's second match of the tournament, against South Africa, Kohli was dismissed for a score of 46. Despite this setback, India went on to secure a commanding 130-run victory in the match. In the subsequent four group matches, India batted second, and Kohli maintained his form, contributing to the team's success with a series of steady performances. He scored 33* against UAE, 33 against West Indies, 44* against Ireland, and 38 against Zimbabwe, respectively. India secured wins in all four fixtures and topped Pool B with an undefeated record. During a highly-anticipated semi-final match against Australia at Melbourne, the Indian team suffered elimination from the tournament. Despite the high expectations for their performance, India's efforts were ultimately thwarted by their opponent. In this contest, Kohli, was dismissed for a score of 1 from 13 deliveries.

Kohli had a slump in form when India toured Bangladesh in June 2015. He contributed only 14 in the one-off Test which ended in a draw and averaged 16.33 in the ODI series which Bangladesh won 2–1. Kohli ended his streak of low scores by scoring his 11th Test hundred in the first Test of the Sri Lankan tour which India lost. India won the next two matches to seal the series 2–1, Kohli's first series win as Test captain and India's first away Test series win in four years. During South Africa's tour of India, Kohli became the fastest batsman in the world at that time to make 1,000 runs in T20I cricket, reaching the milestone in his 27th innings. In the ODI series, he made a century in the fourth ODI at Chennai that helped India win and level the series. India lost the series after a defeat in the final ODI and Kohli finished the series with an average of 49. India came back to beat the top ranked South African team 3–0 in the four-match Test series under Kohli's captaincy, and climbed to number two position on the ICC Test rankings. Virat scored a total of 200 runs in the series at 33.33.

Kohli started 2016 with scores of 91 and 59 in the first two ODIs of the limited-overs tour of Australia. He followed it up with a pair of hundreds, a run-a-ball 117 at Melbourne and 106 from 92 balls at Canberra. During the course of the series he became the fastest batsman in the world to cross the 7000-run mark in ODIs at the time, getting to the milestone in his 161st innings and the fastest to get to 25 centuries. After the ODI series ended in a 1–4 loss, the Indian team came back to whitewash the Australians 3–0 in the T20I series. Kohli made fifties in all three T20Is with scores of 90*, 59* and 50, winning two man of the matches as well as the man of the series award. He was also instrumental in India winning the Asia Cup in Bangladesh the following month, he scored 49 in a run-chase of 84 against Pakistan followed by an unbeaten 56 against Sri Lanka and 41 not out in the Final against Bangladesh.
Kohli maintained his good form in the 2016 ICC World Twenty20 in India, scoring 55* in another successful run-chase against Pakistan. He struck an unbeaten 82 from 51 balls in India's must-win group match against Australia in "an innings of sheer class" with "clean cricket shots". It helped India win by six wickets and register a spot in the semi-final. In the semi-final, Kohli top-scored with an unbeaten 89 from 47 deliveries, but West Indies overhauled India's total of 192 and ended India's campaign. His total of 273 runs in five matches at an average of 136.50 earned him his second consecutive Man of the Tournament award at the World Twenty20. He was named as captain of the 'Team of the Tournament' for the 2016 World Twenty20 by the ICC.

Playing his first Test in the West Indies since his debut series, Kohli scored 200 in the first Test at Antigua to ensure an innings-and-92-run win for India, their biggest win ever outside of Asia. It was his first double hundred in first-class cricket and the first made away from home by an Indian captain in Tests. India went on to wrap the series 2–0 and briefly top the ICC Test Rankings before being displaced by Pakistan at the position. He scored another double hundred, 211 at Indore in the third Test against New Zealand as India's 3–0 whitewash victory saw them regain the top position in the ICC Test Rankings.

2017–2018: Dominant batting and leadership 
Kohli got double centuries in the next two Test series against England and Bangladesh, making him the first batsman ever to score double centuries in four consecutive series. He broke the record of Australian great Donald Bradman and Rahul Dravid, both of whom had managed to get three. Against England, he scored his then-highest Test score of 235.

Kohli got the chance to captain in an ICC tournament for the first time in the 2017 ICC Champions Trophy. In the semi-final against Bangladesh, Kohli scored 96* and became the fastest batsman in terms of innings to reach 8,000 runs in ODIs in 175 innings. India reached the final, but lost to Pakistan by 180 runs. In the third over of Indian innings, Kohli was dropped in the slips for just five runs but caught the next ball by Shadab Khan at point on the bowling of Mohammad Amir. He was also named as part of the 'Team of the Tournament' at the 2017 Champions Trophy by the ICC.

Kohli carried on his form with ODI centuries against the West Indies and Sri Lanka in consecutive series, equalling Ricky Ponting's tally of 30 ODI centuries. In October 2017, he was adjudged the ODI player of the series against New Zealand for scoring two ODI centuries, during the course of which he made a new record for the most runs (8,888), best average (55.55) and highest number of centuries (31) for any batsman when completing 200 ODIs. Kohli made several more records during the 3 match Test series against Sri Lanka at home in November. After scoring a century and a double century in the first two Tests, he ended up scoring yet another double century in the third Test during which he became the eleventh Indian batsman to surpass 5000 runs in Test cricket while scoring his 20th Test century and 6th double century. During this match he also became the first batsman to score six double hundreds as a captain. With 610 runs in the series, Kohli also became the highest run-scorer by an Indian in a three-match Test series and the fourth-highest overall. India comfortably won the three-match series 1–0 and Kohli was adjudged man of the match for the second and third Test matches and player of the series. With this win, India equaled Australia for the record streak of nine consecutive series wins in Test cricket. He ended the year with 2818 international runs, which is recorded as the third-highest tally ever in a calendar year and the highest tally ever by an Indian player. The ICC named Kohli as captain of both their World Test XI and ODI XI for 2017. Kohli farely average in the Test matches as India lost 1–2 during the South Africa tour in 2018 but came back strongly to score 558 runs in the 6 ODIs making a record for the highest runs scored in a bilateral ODI series. This included three centuries, remaining unbeaten in two with a best of 160*. India won the ODI series 5–1 and Kohli became the first Indian captain to win an ODI series in South Africa.

In March 2018, Kohli showed interest to county cricket in England in June in order to improve his batting before the start of India's tour to England the following month. He signed to play for Surrey but a neck injury ruled him out of his stint in England before it even began. On 2 August, Kohli scored his first Test century on English soil in the first test match of the series against England. On 5 August, Kohli displaced Steve Smith to become the No. 1 ranked Test batsman in the ICC Test rankings. He also became the seventh Indian batsman and first since Sachin Tendulkar in June 2011 to achieve this feat. In the third test at Trent Bridge, Nottingham, Kohli scored 97 and 103 and helped India win by 203 runs. At the end of 5-match test series, Kohli scored 593 runs which was third highest runs by an Indian batsman in a losing test series. Kohli's consistent performance in the series against the moving ball when other batsman failed to perform was hailed by British Media as one of his finest. The Guardian describes Kohli's batting display as One of the Greatest batting display in a losing cause.During ODI series against West Indies in 2018, Kohli accomplished a noteworthy achievement. He became the twelfth batsman to amass 10,000 ODI runs in ODIs and achieved this feat at an unprecedented pace, he surpassed this landmark in 54 fewer innings than Sachin Tendulkar, the player who holds the record for being the second-fastest to the landmark. In the course he scored his 37th ODI century. On 27 October, after scoring his 38th ODI century Kohli became the first batsman for India, first captain and tenth overall to score three successive centuries in ODIs. He ended up scoring 453 runs in 5 innings at an average of 151.00 in the 5-match series and was the Player of the Series.
On 16 December 2018 in the 2018–2019 Border Gavaskar Trophy, Kohli scored his 25th test hundred in Perth. His knock of 123 was his 6th hundred in three tours to Australia making him the only Indian to score 6 test hundreds in Australia after Sachin Tendulkar. He also became the fastest Indian and second fastest overall (125 innings) to score 25 test hundreds, second only to Donald Bradman (68 innings); which was bettered by Steven Smith during 2019 Ashes (119 innings). Kohli's knock was rated by several analysts and former cricketers as one of his finest against a quality Australian attack. Although he broke several records in the game his innings proved to be insufficient as India went down by 146 runs as Australia leveled the series with two tests remaining. Overall, he finished the series with 282 runs at an average of 40. By winning the test series in Australia he had become the first Indian and also the first Asian skipper to win a test series in Australia. He was again named as captain of both the World Test XI and ODI XI for 2018 by the ICC.

2019–2020: Record breaking captaincy and batting woes 
In April 2019, he was named the captain of India's squad for the 2019 Cricket World Cup. On 16 June 2019, in India's match against Pakistan, Kohli became the fastest batsman in terms of innings to score 11,000 runs in ODI cricket. He reached the landmark in his 222nd innings. Eleven days later in the match against the West Indies, Kohli became the fastest cricketer in terms of innings to score 20,000 runs in international cricket, doing so in his 417th innings. Kohli scored five consecutive fifty plus scores in the tournament . Nonetheless India lost the semi-final against New Zealand in which Kohli was out for just a run.  After the World Cup , India toured West Indies for 3 T20Is and 3 ODIs followed by two test matches . Kohli was instrumental in ODI series win as he struck back to back hundreds in second and third ODI. He was awarded player of the series for his match performances. In the following test series which India won 2-0, Kohli became most successful test captain for India, going past MS Dhoni who had 27 wins.

In October 2019, Kohli captained India for the 50th time in Test cricket in the second Test against South Africa. In the first innings of the match, Kohli scored an unbeaten 254 runs which is his personnel best at same time passing 7,000 runs in Tests in the process subsequently became the first batsman for India to score seven double centuries in Test cricket. In November 2019, during the day/night Test match against Bangladesh, Kohli became the fastest captain to score 5,000 runs in Test cricket, doing so in his 86th innings. In the same match, he also scored his 70th century in international cricket.

Slump in form 
India toured to New Zealand from January to March 2020 to play 5-match T20I series along with a 3 and 2-match ODI and test series respectively. During the tour, Kolhi only managed to score 218 runs across formats in 12 innings at an average of 19.81 with only one fifty plus score during first ODI. This was his lowest aggregate of runs in a tour where he played in all formats. India managed to win the T20I series 5–0 but during the ODI and Test leg of the tour they lost by 3–0 and 2–0 respectively. The Indian team travelled to Australia in November 2020, touring until January 2021. During the ODI Series, Kohli managed to score two half-centuries in three innings with an aggregate of 173 runs at an average of 57.67. The second match against Australia was Kohli's 250th appearance in an ODI match and became 8th Indian to play this many matches. During the first test of the tour played as day/night match at Adelaide, Kohli scored 74 before getting run out followed by 4 runs in the next innings. This happened in the match in which India were skittled out for 36 . After the first Test, Kohli left the tour on paternity leave as he was expecting the birth of his first child. In November 2020, Kohli was nominated for the Sir Garfield Sobers Award for ICC Male Cricketer of the Decade as well as Test, ODI and T20I player of the decade. He won the awards for Male cricketer of the decade and ODI cricketer of the decade.

2021–2022: Captaincy exit and resurgence 
The English cricket team's tour of India in 2020–2021 began with a long 4-match Test series. Kohli made 172 runs across 4 Test matches, at an average of 28.66 with 2 half-centuries and 2 ducks. During the second test at Chepauk, he scored 62 on a pitch which English batting great Geoffrey Boycott described as a template to bat and score runs on a turning pitch. In 2020, Kohli scored a combined (Test, ODI and T20I) total of 842 runs from 24 innings with highest score of 89 and an average of 36.60.

Kohli was dismissed for a duck again in the 1st T20I of a 5-match series. However, he found his form in the latter part of the series and ended the series as the highest run-scorer from both sides with 231 runs to his name and 3 half-centuries at an average of 115.50. India clinched the series 3–2; Kohli was adjudged as the Man of the Series for his performances. During the second T20I, Kohli became the first ever batsman to complete 3,000 runs in the format. In the 3-match ODI series, Kohli scored 129 runs in 3 innings with 2 half-centuries as India won the series 2–1. During the 2nd ODI, Kohli became the second batsman after Ricky Ponting to score 10,000 runs batting at number 3.

The 2021 ICC World Test Championship Final was played in June 2021, which India lost to New Zealand. This was Kohli's third defeat as captain in a knockout game of an ICC tournament. He scored 44 and 13 in two innings before getting dismissed by Kyle Jamieson on both occasions .

Retirement from captaincy across formats 
In September 2021, Kohli was named as the captain of India's squad for the 2021 ICC Men's T20 World Cup. However, Kohli also publicly announced his decision to step down from the role of T20I captain following the tournament's conclusion. India was unable to advance to the semi-final round, marking the first time in a period of 9 years that India had been excluded from the tournament's latter stages.

In December 2021, Kohli was replaced by Rohit Sharma as India's ODI captain. The BCCI President, Sourav Ganguly, disclosed that Kohli's removal from the ODI captaincy was attributed to the selectors decision to avoid having two leaders for the white ball format. However, he also conveyed that Kohli was asked to remain the captain of the T20I. During a press conference, Kohli disputed the BCCI President's statement, affirming that his decision to step down from the captaincy was well-received and viewed as a positive move by the BCCI officials. Kohli also claimed that he was informed about his dismissal from the ODI captaincy by the chief selector, Chetan Sharma, 90 minutes before the announcement of the Test squad for India's tour of South Africa. More than a week later, during the announcement of the squad for the ODI series against South Africa, Sharma refuted Kohli's claim and stated that the officials had urged him to reconsider his decision to relinquish his role as T20I captain.

Later in 2021 and early 2022, the Indian cricket team toured South Africa for a 3-match test series and a 3-match ODI series. Kohli managed to score 161 runs in the 4 innings of test series he played, averaging at 40.25. He could not play 2nd test of the series due to an injury. On 15 January 2022, Kohli also stepped down as India's Test captain, following the 2–1 test series defeat against South Africa. In the ODI series, Kohli scored 116 runs in 3 innings, including two fifties, with an average of 38.66. However South Africa swept the ODI series against India with a whitewash of 3–0.

The West Indian cricket team toured India in February 2022, for a 3-match ODI series and a 3-match T20I series. During the ODI series, Kohli scored 5,000 run in India in ODIs. He scored a total of 26 runs from 3 innings at an average of 8.66. In the following T20I series Kohli scored a total of 69 runs at an average of 34.50 with the help of a half-century. In FebruaryMarch 2022, Sri Lankan cricket team toured India for a 3-match T20I series and 2-match test series. Kohli amassed a total of 81 runs from the 3 innings, in the 2-match test series, at an average of 27.0. When playing first-match of series, Kohli also completed hundred Test matches, becoming only the 12th Indian cricketer to play this many matches.

Following the fifth test, the Indian cricket team toured England for 3 T20Is and 3 ODIs in 2022. Kohli was not selected to play for the first T20I but was selected to play for the second . He finished the series with 12 runs in 2 innings at an average of 6, a high score of 11, anyhow India won the series 2-1 Kohli was selected to play during the first ODI but was ruled out due an injury in the groin. Kohli failed to impress many and finished the ODI series with 33 runs from 2 innings with a high score of 17 and an average of 16.50, regardless India still won the ODI series 2–1.

Return to form 
Kohli made a resurgence of his form during the Asia Cup 2022, Over the course of the tournament, he amassed a total of 276 runs with a average of 92, The highlight of his performance was his maiden T20I century against Afghanistan, a knock that saw him score 122 runs from 61 deliveries, it was his first century in 1020 days. He later said in post match presentation that:

He carried his good form into the 2022 ICC Men's T20 World Cup. In the first game against Pakistan, Kohli scored 82* and won the match for his team by a close margin. He rated this as his best innings in the format due to the magnitude which the game had. Wisden, the prestigious almanack of cricket, has deemed this particular innings as the acme of the tournament. Kohli finished as the highest run-scorer in the tournament, with 296 runs to his name at an average of 98.66. For his performances, he was included in Team of the tournament.

Kohli was named in India's Test and ODI squad for India Tour of Bangladesh in 2022-23. In third-match, he scored his 44th ODI and overall 72nd century surpassing Ricky Ponting's record of the second-most centuries scored across formats in international cricket.

2023present 
In December 2022, Kohli was selected to be a part of the ODI squad for the series against the Sri Lanka which was set to take place in India during the month of January 2023. In the third match of the series, Kohli delivered a prodigious performance, amassing an unbeaten 166 runs from 110 balls. This century, his 21st in India, marked a milestone as he surpassed all other players for the most ODI centuries scored in the country. Additionally, his performance in this match elevated him to become the fifth highest run-scorer in ODI cricket, going ahead of Mahela Jayawardene.

In FebruaryMarch 2023, Kohli took part in the Border-Gavaskar series of 2023. He faced a string of low scores in the initial three tests, before making a comeback by scoring his 28th century in the final test. This century, which comprised a score of 186 runs, was significant as it came after a period of 1205 days.

Indian Premier League

20082012: Early seasons 
After a successful performance in the Under-19 World Cup, Kohli was signed by the Royal Challengers Bangalore for a sum of  $30,000 as a part youth contract. He was the captain of the franchise for 8 seasons but was futile in winning trophies.

However, his initial performances in the 2008 season were underwhelming, as evidenced by his statistics in the 2008 season, where he managed only 165 runs in 12 innings, averaging 15.00 and striking at a rate of 105.09.

The following season, Kohli showed some improvement with 246 runs at an average of 22.36 and a strike rate of over 112. Despite his improved individual performance, the team was unable to secure the championship, reaching as far as the final.

In the 2010 season, Kohli exhibited a more intermediate level of performance, finishing as the third-highest run-getter for his team with 307 runs. He improved his average to 27.90 and his strike rate to 144.81, offering a glimpse of his potential as a consistent contributor to his team's success.

Prior to the 2011 season, Kohli was the singular player selected by the Royal Challengers franchise to retain his position on the team. Appointed as vice-captain, he exhibited his aptitude for command and authority when he captained the team during several matches in the absence of the regular captain, Daniel Vettori, due to injury.  The Royal Challengers coach, Ray Jennings praised Kohli, stating that the young man of 22 years held the potential to become the future captain not only of the franchise, but of the Indian national team as well. During the season, Kohli lived up to the expectations and was instrumental in leading his team to the runner-up position. He amassed 557 runs, including four half-centuries, with an average of 46.41, earning the distinction of being the second-highest run-scorer for the season, trailing only West-Indian teammate Chris Gayle.

In the 2012 IPL, Kohli's performance was less than stellar, as evidenced by his aggregated total of 364 runs, garnered over the course of 16 matches. His batting average during the season was 28. He returned from the League with a sense of disillusionment with his own performance. He was dissatisfied with the state of his game and was acutely aware of the changes taking place in the dynamics of cricket around the world, including the increasing emphasis on fitness and intensity levels.

20132021:  Captaincy and IPL dominance 

After Vettori's retirement, Kohli was appointed as the team's captain for the 2013 season. Throughout the season, Kohli demonstrated a strong performance, scoring 634 runs in the tournament at an average of 45.28 and a striking rate of 138.  Against the Delhi Daredevils, Kohli nearly reached his maiden century with a score of 99, eventually falling short by one run. Despite this, his impressive performance helped secure a 4-run victory for his team.

In IPL 2014, Kohli had a relatively colder season, recording 359 runs across 14 matches with a batting average of 27.61 and a strike rate of 122.10, he was able to notch two half-centuries and his best score was a commanding 73. His team, ultimately placed seventh in the tournament. Despite the team's mediocre performance, Kohli remained a popular figure and was the most searched player leading into the following season.

During the 2015 IPL, Kohli experienced a resurgence in his batting performance, contributing towards securing his team's qualification to the playoffs. He finished the season as the fifth highest run-scorer, amassing a total of 505 runs at an average of 45.90 and a strike rate exceeding 130. In the 46th match of the season, Kohli scored an undefeated 82 runs in a match against the Mumbai Indians. This innings was highlighted by his partnership with AB De Villiers, in which the duo collaborated for a 215-run stand, marking the third instance of a 200-run partnership in IPL history.

In the 2016 IPL season, Kohli, captaining the Royal Challengers Bangalore, led his team to athird runners-up finish and shattered the record for most runs scored in a single season of the tournament. The previous record of 733 runs, held jointly by  Chris Gayle and Mike Hussey, was surpassed by Kohli as he amassed 973 runs in 16 matches, averaging 81.08 runs per game. This performance earned him the coveted Orange Cap and the esteemed Most Valuable Player Award of the Vivo IPL 2016. Kohli's campaign was marked by his remarkable innings, with four centuries to his name, a feat previously unaccomplished by him in the Twenty20 format. In a match against Kings XI Punjab, he played a knock of 113*, which remained  as his best performance of the season. In October 2016, Kohli announced at the launch event of his biography, "Driven: The Virat Kohli Story" in New Delhi, that he would permanently play for Royal Challengers Bangalore, the franchise he had been captaining for several seasons.

During the 2017 season, Kohli was unable to participate in the initial matches due to a shoulder injury. With his absence, the Royal Challengers Bangalore endured a dismal campaign, ending the tournament at the foot of the standings. However, Kohli's individual performance was noteworthy, as he was the leading run-scorer for the franchise, amassing 308 runs from the 10 matches he participated in, including four half-centuries. To commemorate the 10th anniversary of the IPL, Kohli was also accorded the distinction of being named in the all-time ESPN Cricinfo IPL XI, recognizing his contributions to the league as one of its premier batsmen.

The consummate batsman notched another feat, as he became the first player to amass over 500 runs in five different seasons, by scoring 530 runs at an average of 48. Despite Kohli's unwavering efforts, the Royal Challengers Bangalore's journey in the season was cut short as they failed to qualify for the Playoffs, ultimately settling for a sixth place on the league table.

In the 2019 IPL season, Kohli etched his name in the annals of IPL history by reaching the milestone of 5000 runs, becoming only the second player to achieve this feat after Suresh Raina. During the competition, the skipper also overtook Raina to become the leading run-scorer in IPL , after his innings of 84 runs against Kolkata Knight Riders. His achievements were further magnified by the fact that he notched up his fifth IPL century, in an away match against the same opposition. Despite his output, totaling 464 runs at a strike rate of 141.46, the Royal Challengers Bangalore struggled under Kohli's captaincy, ultimately finishing at the bottom of the league standings.

Upon the resumption of cricket following the lockdown, Kohli returned to the field with cautious optimism. Despite his five-month hiatus from the sport, he expressed surprise at the smoothness of his performance. During the 2020 season, Kohli amassed 466 runs in 15 matches, averaging at 42.36 and striking at a rate of 121.35. This saw him take the 9th place among the tournament's highest run-scorers, his team, Royal Challengers Bangalore, was eliminated in the eliminator match against Sunrisers Hyderabad, with Kohli's early dismissal in the second over at the hands of Jason Holder playing a significant role in their elimination.

On 22 April 2021, during a match against the Rajasthan Royals, Kohli accomplished a feat by becoming the first player to surpass the 6000 run-mark in the Indian Premier League. Subsequently, on 20 September, the Royal Challengers Bangalore announced that Kohli would be stepping down from his captaincy role after the conclusion of the 2021 IPL season. During the same season, Kohli amassed 405 runs at an average of 28.92 over the course of 15 games, with three half-centuries to his name, including a standout performance of 72 not out.

2022present: Post captaincy 
Although his performance in the tournament was not up to his usual standards, Kohli managed to score 341 runs in 16 innings, with an average of 21.31 and a strike rate of 115. In a match against the Punjab Kings at the Brabourne Stadium, Kohli achieved the milestone of 6500 runs in the IPL. In the final league match of the tournament against the Gujarat Titans, he further extended his record with Royal Challengers Bangalore by amassing 7000 runs. Despite these accomplishments, the 2022 season was a disappointing one for Kohli, marked by a series of three innings in which he was dismissed without scoring, including two consecutive golden ducks.

Player profile

Playing style 

Kohli is considered as an enterprising batsman, possessing technical abilities and a dynamic playing demeanor. His customarily batting position in ODl cricket is at number three, with a slightly open-chested stance, and a resolute grip on the bottom handle of his bat. He has been noted for his agile footwork, expansive range of strokes, and his propensity for adeptly orchestrating innings whilst thriving in high-pressure situations. In his batting technique, Kohli tends to favor playing grounded shots rather than attempting big hits. He is appreciated for his ability to execute wrist shots and his consistent prowess in the mid-wicket and cover region.

Kohli has often expressed his admiration for the cover drive, which he considers to be his signature stroke. He possesses a natural aptitude for the flick shot, particularly when facing deliveries aimed towards leg stump. Having a limited recourse to the sweep shot, Kohli's batting technique is characterized by an emphasis on ground shots that primarily yield runs in the regions between deep square leg and mid-on. Kohli is known for his composed batting technique and versatility in his play. He scores runs between long-off and long-on with an aligned bat, while also possessing the ability to display a destructive streak. His combination of bat-speed and supple wrist movements enable him to craft innovative angles that disrupt traditional field positioning. Kohli is also a proficient fielder, recognized for his quick reflexes and sure-handedness.

However, Kohli has a known vulnerability to deliveries that are wide of the off-stump. Bowlers often exploit this weakness by targeting him with such deliveries, especially in Test and ODl matches. This vulnerability has resulted in Kohli's dismissal on numerous occasions. Cricket experts such as VVS Laxman and former India cricketer Sanjay Manjrekar have acknowledged this weakness, and former New Zealand cricketer Richard Hadlee has also noted that Kohli is particularly susceptible to out-swinging deliveries.

Kohli has garnered widespread acclaim and recognition as a preeminent limited-overs batsman by cricketing experts and aficionados alike. In ODIs, he boasts an average of 66 runs when batting second and 48 runs when batting first. He has amassed 26 of his 46 ODI hundreds in run-chases, and holds the record for the most hundreds scored when batting second. In reference to his success while batting second, Kohli has expressed a fondness for the challenge of chasing, relishing the opportunity to test himself and demonstrate his ability to efficiently manage strike rotation and execute boundary hits. His colleagues admire his self-assurance, dedication, concentration, and work ethic, which are the driving forces behind his success.

Aggression 
Kohli's playing style is widely regarded as aggressive, a trait that extends to his leadership on the field. He is well known for his passionate and animated responses to on-field situations, demonstrating a fierce competitiveness. His captaincy is characterized as proactive, taking bold decisions and leading the team by example. Kohli has been the subject of much media scrutiny and criticism in the early stages of his career. He was often portrayed as a brash and arrogant individual, eliciting mixed reactions from fans, critics and former cricketers alike. While some have praised his assertiveness and confidence, others have criticized Kohli's behavior for crossing the boundaries of fair play and for losing control, sometimes resulting in a loss of composure. Despite his efforts to curb his aggressive behavior, Kohli has acknowledged that there are times when intense pressure or high-stakes situations may challenge his resolve. Nevertheless, the cricketer has persistently maintained that his aggression acts as a source of inspiration and drives his focus and motivation on the field. In contrast to certain former Indian cricketers who have exhibited an inclination towards excessive politeness and reticence, Kohli is widely regarded as a self-assured and confident individual who embodies his combative demeanor both on and off the cricket field.

Comparisons to Sachin Tendulkar 
Kohli's batting style and approach to the game have frequently drawn comparisons to the legendary Sachin Tendulkar, who he regarded as the epitome of excellence in the sport of cricket. Dubbed as Tendulkar's "successor", he is widely considered to have the potential to surpass his records in the future. His reverence for Tendulkar as a role model, who he idolized in his formative years and sought to emulate, is well-documented. Kohli has stated that he tried to mirror Tendulkar's style of batting, imitating his shots and attempting to hit sixes in a similar manner. Kohli's aggressive and dynamic style has earned him accolades from cricketing greats such as Vivian Richards, who has acknowledged Kohli's similarities to his own playing style. He has been lauded as the "new king of world cricket" by Dean Jones, a former Australian cricketer. While Indian commentator Aakash Chopra has noted that Tendulkar possessed a broader array of shots, Kohli's skills with the bat have earned him accolades from former West Indies great Brian Lara, who has ranked him among the best batsmen in the world alongside Joe Root, the England captain at the time.

In a discourse with the prominent Bollywood actor Salman Khan, Tendulkar proclaimed that Kohli possesses the potential to surpass his record of 100 international centuries. The celebrated batsman, widely deemed as one of the greatest cricketers of all time, acknowledged Kohli's batting aptitudes and the steadfastness with which he has accumulated runs , it is not a far-fetched possibility for him to surpass the landmark set by Tendulkar himself. In 2013, Tendulkar retired from international cricket, marking the end of an era for Indian cricket. Kohli, who played alongside Tendulkar in the team, honoured him by presenting him with a sacred thread that had been gifted to him by his late father. Tendulkar eventually returned the thread to him, imploring that it should remain in his possession.

In popular culture 

In 2008, Kohli was approached by sports agent Bunty Sajdeh of Cornerstone Sport and Entertainment after his notable performance in the ICC Under-19 World Cup. Sajdeh was impressed with Kohli's leadership skills and attitude and saw great potential in the young cricketer. After being recommended by Yuvraj Singh, Kohli was signed to Cornerstone Sport and Entertainment. His bat deal with MRF is regarded as one of the most financially rewarding deals in cricket history. This deal made Kohli the first Indian athlete to sign a brand endorsement contract valued at  deal with a brand. Kohli is currently recognized as the most followed Asian individual on the social media platform Instagram, boasting over 237 million followers on the platform.

Kohli has gained international acclaim for his athletic achievements and widespread popularity, earning a prominent place among the world's most renowned athletes, as per ESPN. In 2014, American Appraisal conducted an evaluation of Kohli's brand value and determined it to be $56.4 million, placing him fourth on the list of India's most valued celebrity brands. The following two years saw Kohli's brand value soar higher. As per a report published in October 2016 by Duff & Phelps, Kohli's brand worth had increased to $92 million, second only to that of Bollywood actor Shah Rukh Khan. In 2017, Kohli was recognized by Forbes as the seventh "Most Valuable Brand among Athletes", surpassing renowned sports figures such as Lionel Messi, Rory McIlroy, and Stephen Curry, with a brand estimation of $14.5 million. By September of the same year, Kohli had amassed endorsement agreements with 17 distinct brands, and he announced that he would only endorse products that he personally uses and believes in. The following year, he was featured on Time magazine's annual list of the 100 most influential people in the world. In 2019, Kohli was the only cricketer included in Forbes' list of "World's 100 Highest-Paid Athletes". He was ranked 100th on the list, with earnings estimated at $25 million, with $21 million being procured through endorsements, and the remainder from salary and tournament winnings. Furthermore, in March 2019, Kohli was named the brand ambassador of the mobile esports platform, Mobile Premier League. Kohli's earning potential continued to climb, and in 2020, he attained the 66th spot in Forbes compilation of the top 100 highest-paid athletes in the world for the year 2020, with estimated earnings exceeding $26 million. In April 2021, Vivo appointed Kohli as their brand ambassador ahead of the Indian Premier League.

In 2012, Kohli was recognized as one of the best-dressed men by the fashion magazine GQ, appearing on their annual list alongside prominent figures such as Barack Obama. In the year 2018, a documentary highlighting Kohli's cricketing career was released on National Geographic channel. The film aimed to celebrate his accomplishments in the sport. In 2019, on the eleventh anniversary of his international debut, Kohli was honoured with a stand named after him at the Feroz Shah Kotla Stadium in Delhi, making him the youngest cricketer to receive such a recognition. In November of the same year, an Indian animated superhero television series entitled Super V premiered, featuring a fictionalized portrayal of Kohli's teenage years and his discovery of superpowers.

Outside cricket

Personal life 

Kohli's romantic association with Bollywood actress Anushka Sharma, which commenced in 2013, earned the duo the moniker of "Virushka". During an interview with Graham Bensinger, Kohli divulged that he had encountered Sharma for the first time, when they were both were engaged in a promotional shoot for Clear shampoo. Their union since then has attracted significant media interest, with persistent rumors and speculations swirling around in the press, as both parties remained reticent about publicly discussing the relationship. On 11 December 2017, the couple exchanged nuptials in an intimate ceremony held in Florence, Italy, becoming one of the most talked-about celebrity couples in the country. On 11 January 2021, their union was blessed with the arrival of a daughter, marking a new chapter in their lives. The couple named their first born child, a daughter, Vamika. The child's name, Vamika, is derived from Sanskrit, meaning "little goddess".

In 2018, Kohli disclosed that he had made the decision to adopt a vegetarian diet in an effort to alleviate the symptoms of a cervical spine issue caused by elevated levels of uric acid. This condition was impacting his finger movements, and thus, affecting his performance as a batsman. He made a conscious effort to abstain from consuming meat, as part of his regimen for maintaining optimal health. He has since clarified that his dietary choices do not align with a vegan lifestyle and he continues to consume dairy products. Kohli is widely recognized for his physical fitness and intense training regimen. He has been an advocate of leading a healthy lifestyle, which involves regular exercise and a nutritious diet. His hard work and discipline in this area have earned him the reputation of being one of the fittest cricketers in the world.

Kohli has acknowledged to harbor a belief in superstitions. He has publicly avowed his reliance upon various lucky charms and rituals that he feels serve to bring him good fortune on the cricket field. One such tradition involves the donning of black wristbands, which he adheres to as a talismanic tradition. Additionally, he is known to prefer a particular pair of gloves, which he has consistently worn due to their supposed propensity to bring him success. Furthermore, Kohli has been observed sporting a kara, a traditional bangle often worn for religious or spiritual purposes, on his right arm since 2012. In addition to the previously mentioned superstitions, Kohli has also established the ritual of consistently donning white shoes on the cricket field.

Kohli's corporeal canvas bears testament to his spiritual and familial devotion, as well as to his love of sport and cultural appreciation. Adorned with intricate and meaningful tattoos, Kohli's skin bears an image of the revered Hindu deity Lord Shiva in the form of a meditation pose on the holy mountain of Kailash, symbolizing his devotion to the deity. He also has tattoos of the sacred syllable "Om" and the names of his parents, Prem and Saroj. Additionally, Kohli sports a tribal emblem, a representation of a serene monastery, a samurai warrior, the astrological symbol of the scorpion, and his ODl and Test match cap numbers.

Commercial investments 

Kohli invested in Indian Super League club FC Goa, which he co-owned as of 2014, reflects his ambition to support and cultivate the growth of football in India. Beyond the realm of cricket, this venture served as a future business opportunity for him, as he sought to diversify his portfolio after retirement from the sport. In November 2014, Kohli partnered with Anjana Reddy's Universal Sportsbiz (USPL) to launch the youth fashion brand WROGN. The brand specialized in men's casual wear clothing and entered into collaborations with prominent retail outlets such as Myntra and Shopper's Stop. Additionally, in late 2014, Kohli became a shareholder and brand ambassador for the London-based social networking venture "Sport Convo". His involvement aimed to promote and raise awareness of the platform, which was focused on providing a space for sports fans to connect and engage with one another.

In 2015, Kohli invested a sum of  towards the establishment of a chain of health clubs and fitness centers throughout the Indian territory. Dubbed as "Chisel", the network of gyms was established through a joint venture between Kohli, Chisel India, and CSE (Cornerstone Sport and Entertainment), the organization responsible for managing Kohli's commercial pursuits. In September of the same year, Kohli expanded his portfolio of sports-related investments by becoming a co-owner of the International Premier Tennis League franchise, UAE Royals. In quick succession, he also became a co-owner of the JSW-owned Bengaluru Yodhas franchise in the Pro Wrestling League. These ventures demonstrate Kohli's astute business acumen and his commitment to promoting and supporting various sports in India and beyond.

In the year 2016, Kohli embarked on a new venture, which aimed to promote fitness among children. He joined forces with Stepathlon Lifestyle to launch Stepathlon Kids. The initiative aimed to encourage young individuals to adopt healthy lifestyle habits and inculcate the love for physical activity.

In 2017, Kohli entered into a partnership with the German sportswear brand, Puma, to launch his athletic lifestyle brand, One8. This brand offers a range of sport-related apparel, footwear, and accessories designed for active individuals. That same year, Kohli also established Nueva, a fine dining establishment located in New Delhi. The restaurant features a South American-inspired decor accentuated with Native American artwork, providing a distinctive culinary setting. Kohli also established One8 Commune, a chain of restaurant-bars that offer a modern and sophisticated ambiance that appeals to a diverse age range. This marked his inaugural foray into the food and beverage industry. The first outlet of this restaurant was launched in 2017.

Additionally, they also extended their support to Blue Tribe, a startup that specializes in the production and distribution of plant-based meat products. Driven by his own inclination towards a plant-based diet, Kohli aims to raise awareness and encourage individuals to adopt more sustainable and environmentally conscious practices.

Philanthropy 

In 2013, Kohli established the "Virat Kohli Foundation" with a philanthropic objective to support underprivileged children. The foundation collaborates with a selected group of NGOs to increase awareness and gather support for various causes that are instrumental in advancing their mission of promoting the welfare and well-being of these children. In 2014, the foundation participated in a charity auction organized by eBay and Save the Children India, the proceeds of which were directed towards the education and healthcare of underprivileged children. Kohli is dedicated to creating a brighter future for children by implementing sports-based programs and providing them with necessary resources, leveraging his connections and partnerships to uplift marginalized segments of society.

Kohli's foundation has organized several charity events to raise funds for its causes, including football matches featuring prominent Indian cricketers and Bollywood actors. The first such event was a celebrity football match in collaboration with Abhishek Bachchan's charity foundation, which drew significant media attention and was successful in raising funds. In this match, Kohli captained the All Hearts FC against the All Stars FC, led by Abhishek Bachchan. Another charity football match, dubbed the "Celebrity Clasico," was held in June 2016 in Mumbai, with Kohli once again leading the All Hearts FC against the All Stars FC, captained by Ranbir Kapoor. This event was also a major success in generating funds for charitable causes.

In 2016, the Virat Kohli Foundation entered into a partnership with Smile Foundation to promote the empowerment of underprivileged children and young people. To kickstart this initiative, Kohli organized a philanthropic dinner at Hyatt Regency in Mumbai, graced by the presence of cricketing luminaries such as MS Dhoni, Shikhar Dhawan, Yuvraj Singh, Ajinkya Rahane, and KL Rahul to support the cause of child and youth empowerment. To advance the goals of the Swachh Bharat Mission (SBM), which aims at creating a cleaner India, Kohli and the Indian cricket team, in collaboration with Anurag Sharma, undertook a cleaning initiative at the Eden Gardens on the occasion of Gandhi Jayanti of 2016.

Prior to a match against Sri Lanka in 2017 Champions Trophy, Kohli hosted a benevolent gala event in London in support of the Justice and Care organization. The ball was arranged with the objective of increasing both funds and awareness for the humanitarian cause championed by Justice and Care. The organization endeavors to combat the pernicious issues of human trafficking and contemporary slavery. In 2017, Kohli established the Athlete Development Programme (ADP) as a platform for nurturing and supporting aspiring young athletes. This initiative provides comprehensive guidance to these young athletes in areas such as coaching, training, fitness, competition, and nutrition, thereby fostering their growth and development. The program has proven beneficial to several young sports persons, including tennis player Swastika Ghosh and golfer Aadil Bedi.

In response to the COVID-19 pandemic of 2020, Kohli and his wife Anushka Sharma pledged donations to the PM Relief Fund and the Maharashtra CM Relief Fund. The couple has a strong passion for animal welfare and have made personal contributions towards wildlife relief efforts. Through his support of Awaaz, Kohli seeks to provide comprehensive medical services, shelter, and sustenance to stray animals.

Career summary 

, Kohli has made 75 centuries and 7 double centuries in international cricket—28 centuries, 7 double centuries in Test cricket, 46 centuries in One Day Internationals (ODIs), and 1 century in T20I.

Test match performance

ODI match performance

T20I match performance 

Kohli holds a prominent place in the annals of Indian cricket. He has the distinction of being the only cricketer to have been named the Player of the Tournament in the T20 World Cup on two separate occasions, in 2014 and 2016. In terms of ODI centuries, he ranks second with 46, behind Sachin Tendulkar who holds the record with 49.  Furthermore, in international cricket, Kohli has amassed 75 centuries, once again second only to Sachin Tendulkar's 100 centuries. In 2018, Kohli set a  record, becoming the first player to score 1,000 ODI runs in 11 innings in a calendar year. In 2022, he achieved another milestone by scoring 1,000 runs in the ICC Men's T20 World Cup, becoming the second player to reach this feat after Mahela Jayawardene. During match against Bangladesh Kohli etched his name for the highest number of runs scored in the tournament.

Test records 
 Most Wins as captain of India, with 40 wins out of 68 matches .
 Four Test double-hundreds in four consecutive series.

ODI records 
 Most ODI centuries while chasing (26).
 Most ODI centuries in India (21).
 Fastest to - 8,000 runs(175 innings) 9,000 runs(194 innings) 10,000 runs(205 innings) 11,000 runs(222 innings) 12,000 runs(242 innings)

T20I records 
 Most runs in T20 internationals - 4,008 runs.
 Most Fifty plus scores in the career - 38 (including 37 fifties and 1 century).
 Highest career batting  average in T20I - 52.73.
 Fastest to - 3,000 runs(81 innings) 3,500 runs(96 innings)
 Most player of the match(15 times) and player of the series awards(7 times).

IPL records 
 Most runs in Indian Premiere League - 6,624 runs.
 Most runs in a single edition of IPL - 973 runs (2016).
 Only player to be involved in three double-century plus stands , two times with AB de Villiers and once with Chris Gayle.
 Fastest to -  5,000 runs(165 innings)  6,000 runs (188 innings)
 Most runs against Delhi Capitals(925).
 Most hundreds in a season (4).

Honours

National honours 
2013 – Arjuna Award, second highest sporting honour.
2017 –   Padma Shri , India's fourth highest civilian award.
2018 – Major Dhyan Chand Khel Ratna Award, India's highest sporting honour.

Sporting honours 
 Sir Garfield Sobers Trophy (ICC Men's Cricketer of the Decade): 2011–2020
 Sir Garfield Sobers Trophy (ICC Cricketer of the Year): 2017, 2018
 ICC ODI Player of the Year: 2012, 2017, 2018
 ICC Test Player of the Year: 2018
 ICC ODI Team of the Year: 2012, 2014, 2016 (captain), 2017 (captain), 2018 (captain), 2019 (captain)
 ICC Test Team of the Year: 2017 (captain), 2018 (captain), 2019 (captain)
 ICC Men's T20I Team of the Year: 2022
ICC Spirit of Cricket: 2019
 ICC Men's ODI Cricketer of the Decade: 2011–2020
 ICC Men's Test Team of the Decade: 2011–2020 (captain)
 ICC Men's ODI Team of the Decade: 2011–2020
 ICC Men's T20I Team of the Decade: 2011–2020
 Polly Umrigar Award for International Cricketer of the Year: 2011–12, 2014–15, 2015–16, 2016–17, 2017–18
 Wisden Leading Cricketer in the World: 2016, 2017, 2018
 ICC Men's Player of the Month: October 2022
 CEAT International Cricketer of the Year: 2011–12, 2013–14, 2017 18, 2018–19
 Indian Premier League Orange Cap for most runs: 2016
 Barmy Army – International Player of Year: 2017, 2018
 ESPNcricinfo – ODI Batting Performance of the Year: 2012

Other honours and awards 
People's Choice Awards India For Favourite Sportsperson: 2012
GQ Sportsman of the year: 2013
CNN-News18 Indian of the Year: 2017
 Delhi & District Cricket Association (DDCA) renamed a stand after Kohli at Feroz Shah Kotla, Delhi.

See also 
 Sports in India – Overview of sport in India
 List of players who have scored 10,000 or more runs in One Day International cricket
 List of cricketers by number of international centuries scored
 List of cricketers who have scored centuries in both innings of a Test match
 List of cricketers with centuries in all international formats
 List of most-followed Instagram accounts

Notes

References

Bibliography

External links 

 
 
 
 
 

1988 births
Living people
Indian cricketers
India Test cricketers
India One Day International cricketers
India Twenty20 International cricketers
Royal Challengers Bangalore cricketers
Delhi cricketers
Cricketers at the 2011 Cricket World Cup
Cricketers at the 2015 Cricket World Cup
Cricketers at the 2019 Cricket World Cup
Cricketers from Delhi
India Test cricket captains
North Zone cricketers
Punjabi people
Indian Hindus
Punjabi Hindus
People from Delhi
Recipients of the Padma Shri in sports
International Cricket Council Cricketer of the Year
Wisden Cricketers of the Year
Recipients of the Khel Ratna Award
Recipients of the Arjuna Award
Wisden Leading Cricketers in the World
21st-century Indian people